František Halas (3 October 1901 in Brno – 27 October 1949 in Prague) was one of the most significant Czech lyric poets of the 20th century, an essayist, and a translator.

Life 
Born as the son of textile worker, Halas worked as bookseller. He was self-taught, without higher education. After 1921 he started publishing in the communist newspapers Rovnost and Sršatec, and in 1926 he became an editor at the Prague publishing house Orbis. During World War II he was active in the resistance movement, and after 1945 he was engaged at the Ministry of Information.

Work 
poetry:

Sepie (1927)
Kohout plaší smrt (1930)
Tvář (1931)
Hořec (1933)
Dělnice (1934)
Staré ženy (1935)
Dokořán (1936)
Torzo naděje (1938)
Naše paní Božena Němcová (1940)
Ladění (1942)
Já se tam vrátím (1947)
V řadě (1948)

References 
Bohuš Balajka: Přehledné dějiny literatury II. Prague: Fortuna, 2005.

External links

 Biography
 Biography 

1901 births
1949 deaths
Writers from Brno
People from the Margraviate of Moravia
Communist Party of Czechoslovakia politicians
Members of the Interim National Assembly of Czechoslovakia
Czech communists
Czech poets
Czech male poets
Surrealist poets
Czech surrealist writers
Czech translators
20th-century translators
20th-century Czech poets
Communist poets
Recipients of the Order of Tomáš Garrigue Masaryk